Brachanthemum is a genus of flowering plants in the aster family, Asteraceae. They are native to Asia.

 Species
 Brachanthemum baranovii - Altay 
 Brachanthemum fruticulosum - Siberia (Altay, Buryatiya), Xinjiang, Kazakhstan, Mongolia
 Brachanthemum gobicum - Mongolia
 Brachanthemum kasakhorum - Kazakhstan, Uzbekistan, West Siberia
 Brachanthemum kirghisorum - Altay, Xinjiang, Kazakhstan, Uzbekistan, Kyrgyzstan
 Brachanthemum krylovii - Altay
 Brachanthemum mongolicum  - Xinjiang, Kazakhstan, Mongolia
 Brachanthemum mongolorum - Mongolia
 Brachanthemum pulvinatum - Gansu, Inner Mongolia, Xinjiang, Qinghai 
 Brachanthemum titovii - Altay, Xinjiang, Kazakhstan, Uzbekistan, Kyrgyzstan

References

Anthemideae
Asteraceae genera